Perur is a legislative assembly constituency in Coimbatore district, that includes the city, Perur. Perur was reserved for scheduled caste from 1967 to 1977. Perur assembly constituency was part of Coimbatore Parliamentary constituency.

Members of the Legislative Assembly

De-Notification 
The Perur Constituency was de-notified and removed from the list of constituencies in 2007. The areas coming under it were merged with the existing Thondamuthur and the newly created North Coimbatore Constituency.

Election results

2006

2001

1996

1991

1989

1984

1980

1977

1971

1967

References

External links
 

Former assembly constituencies of Tamil Nadu
Coimbatore district